RTI-352 is a phenyltropane that is used as a radiolabeling ligand for the DAT.

RTI-352 is a geometric isomer of RTI-55 (β-CIT).

Based on X-ray crystallography, this compound is in a tautomeric equilibrium residing mostly on the side of the boat-shaped conformer.

References

Tropanes
RTI compounds